Randy Dwumfour (born 23 November 2000) is a Ghanaian professional footballer who play as a midfielder for the Greek Super League 2 club Episkopi.

References

2000 births
Living people
Footballers from Accra
Ghanaian footballers
Association football midfielders
KF Skënderbeu Korçë players
Kategoria Superiore players
Ghanaian expatriate sportspeople in Albania
Expatriate footballers in Albania
Ghanaian expatriate footballers